"Outlet" is a song by American rapper Desiigner. It was released on February 10, 2017, for digital download by GOOD Music and Def Jam Recordings. The song is written by Sidney Selby III, Anderson Hernandez, Rian Basilio and Corey Thompson while the production is primarily handled by Vinylz with co-production by CT and additional production by Mike Dean.

Music video
The song's accompanying music video premiered on June 21, 2017, on Desiigner's YouTube account. The video was filmed mostly at Manchester United's Old Trafford and features a cameo appearance from Paul Pogba.

Charts

References

External links
Lyrics of this song at Genius

2017 singles
2017 songs
Def Jam Recordings singles
GOOD Music singles
Song recordings produced by Vinylz
Songs written by Vinylz
Desiigner songs
Song recordings produced by Mike Will Made It